{{DISPLAYTITLE:C6H7NO2}}
The molecular formula C6H7NO2 (molar mass: 125.125 g/mol, exact mass: 125.0477 u) may refer to:

 Ethyl cyanoacrylate (ECA)
 3-Hydroxyisonicotinaldehyde (HINA)
 N-Ethylmaleimide (NEM)